Lava (established 1977 in Årdal, Norway) is a Norwegian jazz-rock band, known from a series of recordings in the 1980s (Polydor Records).

Career 
The initiators Per Hillestad (drums), Svein Dag Hauge (guitar) were joined by Kjell Hestetun (bass) and Stein Eriksen (keyboards) and released the jazz funk influenced album Lava (1980), with contributions from Geir Langslet (keyboards) and Olav Stedje (vocals).

When Hestetun and Eriksen left the band, the quartet Hauge, Hillestad and Langslet and bassist Rolf Graf continued releasing the album Cruisin (1981), with contributions by Per Kolstad (piano), Sigurd Køhn (saxophone) and Marius Müller (guitar), and the track «Take Your Time» became Norway and Europe hit.

Their third album was Prime Time (1982) with Egil Eldøen as new vocalist accompanied by Sidsel Endresen on one track. In addition to the regular lineup, Per Kolstad and Sigurd Køhn contributed on this album. It was followed by a tour with Randy Crawford (1983), also contributing on the album Fire (1984). This is Lavas best-selling albums and it was awarded Spellemannsprisen (1984) in the class Pop.

Later, the group released Prime Cuts (1985), Rhythm of Love (1990) and The Very Best of Lava (1996). On the next two albums Polarity (2003) and Alibi (2005), Geir Langslet was substituted by Stein Austrud (keyboards) Kåre Kolve contributed as saxophonist. The last album Symphonic Journey (2009) was recorded live with Kringkastingsorkestret at Rockefeller. Lava also collaborated with guest artists like Randy Crawford.

Band members 

Present members
Svein Dag Hauge - guitar (1977-)
Per Hillestad - drums & percussion (1977-)
Rolf Graf - bass (1980-) 
Per Kolstad - piano (1982-1989, 2003-)

Associated members 
Stein Austrud - keyboards (2003-)
Kåre Kolve - saxophone (1990-)
Eythor Gunnarsson - keyboards (1990-)

Past members
Kjell Hestetun - bass (1980-)
Stein Eriksen - keyboards (1980-)
Egil Eldøen - vocals (1982-)
Sigurd Køhn - saksofon (1982-1989, 2003-2004)
Marius Müller - guitar (1980-1981) 
Geir Langslet - keyboards (1980-2003)

Guest vocalists
Sidsel Endresen
Randy Crawford

Honors 
1984: Spellemannprisen in the class Pop

Discography

Studio albums

Compilation albums

Live albums

References

External links
Lava Biography at Store Norske Leksikon

Norwegian pop music groups
Norwegian jazz ensembles
Spellemannprisen winners
Norwegian rock music groups
Musical groups established in 1977
Musical groups from Oslo
Brain Records artists
Polydor Records artists
Musicians from Årdal